Bamboozle means to fool or cheat someone. 

Bamboozle or bamboozled may also refer to:

Bamboozle!, a quiz game that was featured on Channel 4 Teletext in the United Kingdom
The Bamboozle, an annual three-day music festival held in New Jersey
Bamboozled, a 2000 satirical film written and directed by Spike Lee
Bamboozled (soundtrack), the soundtrack to the 2000 film

See also
 Confidence trick